Fusebox was an American contemporary Christian music band from Atlanta, Georgia and Nashville, Tennessee, and they formed in 2000 and disbanded in 2006, while their frontman was Billy Buchanan. They released, Lost in Worship, with Inpop Records and Elevate Records, in 2002. Through the same label they released Once Again in 2004, and saw the single, "Once Again", placed on the Billboard Christian Songs chart.

Background
The contemporary Christian music and Christian rock band formed in Atlanta, Georgia and Nashville, Tennessee, in 2000. They count as their members; lead vocalist and bass guitarist, Billy Buchanan, guitarists, Brad Duncan, Nash Overstreet, Tim Braisted and Reggie Terrell, also on keys, bass guitarists, Steve Conrad and Tim Braisted, and drummer and background vocalist, Guy Roberts. The group disbanded in 2006, after they released two albums, and those were with Elevate Records and Inpop Records.

Music history
The group formed in 2000, with their first major label release studio album, Lost in Worship, by Inpop Records and Elevate Records, which released on February 26, 2002. Their second album with the aforementioned labels, Once Again, released on June 15, 2004. The single, "Once Again", charted on the Billboard magazine Christian Songs chart at No. 32.

Members
Members
 Billy Buchanan – lead vocals, bass, acoustics
 Guy Roberts – drums, background vocals
 Tim Braisted – guitar, bass
 Reggie Terrell – keys, guitar
 Nash Overstreet – guitar
 Brad Duncan – guitar
 Steve Conrad – bass
 Justin Mackey - guitar, background vocals
 Ben Rodriguez - guitar

Discography
Studio albums
 Lost in Worship (February 26, 2002, Elevate/Inpop)
 Once Again (June 15, 2004, Elevate/Inpop)
EPs
 The Modern Worship EP (2001, Independent)
 The Modern Worship EP (2005, Independent)

References

External links
 Cross Rhythms artist profile
 New Release Tuesday artist profile

Musical groups established in 2000
Musical groups disestablished in 2006
Musical groups from Atlanta
Musical groups from Nashville, Tennessee
Inpop Records artists